Sir Andrew Centlivres Longmore  (born 25 August 1944), styled The Rt Hon. Lord Justice Longmore, is a British lawyer and judge.

Educated at Winchester College and Lincoln College, Oxford, he was called to the Bar at the Middle Temple in 1966 and was appointed a QC in 1983. A Judge of the High Court from 1993, he rose to the rank of Lord Justice of Appeal in 2001.

Judgments
Key judgments of Lord Justice Longmore include:
 Lomas v JFB Firth Rixson Inc [2012] EWCA 419<ref>Described as a "comprehensive judgment [which] masterfully resolved a number of conflicting strands of jurisprudence". {{cite journal |url=http://cmlj.oxfordjournals.org/content/8/4/395.short |title=Lomas v Firth Rixson: 'As you were!' |journal=Capital Markets Law Journal |volume=8 |page=395 |author=Edward Murray |year=2013 |issue=4 |doi=10.1093/cmlj/kmt020 |access-date=3 September 2015}}</ref>Collier v P & MJ Wright (Holdings) Ltd'' [2007] EWCA Civ 1329, [2008] 1 WLR 643 - English contract law concerning the doctrine of consideration and promissory estoppel in relation to "alteration promises".

References

1944 births
Living people
People educated at Winchester College
Alumni of Lincoln College, Oxford
21st-century English judges
Members of the Middle Temple
20th-century English judges
Queen's Bench Division judges
Lords Justices of Appeal
Knights Bachelor
Members of the Privy Council of the United Kingdom
20th-century King's Counsel
English King's Counsel